David Charles Jackson (4 March 1955, Wellington – 29 September 2004) was a boxer from New Zealand, who competed at the 1976 Summer Olympics in Montreal, where he was eliminated in the second round of the Welterweight (– 69 kg) division at the hands of Valery Rachkov from the Soviet Union. He also competed at two Commonwealth Games: in 1974 (Christchurch) and 1978 (Edmonton).

1976 Olympic results
Below are the results of David Jackson, a welterweight boxer from New Zealand who competed at the 1976 Montreal Olympics:

 Round of 64: defeated Fredj Chtioui (Tunisia) referee stopped contest in the second round
 Round of 32: lost to Valeri Rachkov (Soviet Union) on points, 0–5

References
 sports-reference

1955 births
2004 deaths
Olympic boxers of New Zealand
Boxers at the 1976 Summer Olympics
Commonwealth Games competitors for New Zealand
Boxers at the 1974 British Commonwealth Games
Boxers at the 1978 Commonwealth Games
Sportspeople from Wellington City
New Zealand male boxers
Welterweight boxers